Embudo (also Embudo Station) is an unincorporated community in Rio Arriba County, New Mexico, United States. It is on New Mexico State Road 68.

Etymology
The name "Embudo", meaning "funnel" in Spanish, was given to the area by early Spanish settlers because the spot where the Rio Embudo flowed between two distinctive cone shaped hills reminded them of a funnel.

Embudo was founded in 1881 when the Denver and Rio Grande Western Railroad opened a station (depot) there on its Chili Line. The station was named after the village San Antonio de Embudo, located two miles up the Embudo Creek, and until 1902 the communities shared a post office and were known jointly as Embudo. In 1900, anticipating a separate post office in the village, San Antonio de Embudo changed its name to Dixon after the Presbyterian missionary Dixon, who established a mission there. When the Dixon post office opened in 1902, however, Embudo lost its post office. Embudo got a post office again in 1905, only to lose it in 1909. However, since 1914 Embudo has had its own post office, zip code 87531.

Transport links
Today, from the state road a concrete bridge, replacing the old wooden bridge, crosses the Rio Grande to the "Embudo Historic District" which consists of the old railway station and associated buildings. The United States Geological Survey (USGS) gauging station at Embudo, to measure the flow of the Rio Grande, was the first (USGS) stream gauging station and was established by John Wesley Powell in 1888. Embudo was also the first USGS training center for hydrographers.

Embudo was originally on U.S. Route 64 (US 64), a major national east-west highway and the main route between Santa Fe and Taos. In 1974 US 64 was realigned to end at Tonopah, Arizona rather than Santa Fe by passing Embudo.

Equally interesting as the old railroad station are the Casa Piedras also known as the Rock-a-Bye, the station master's home about a mile north of the station. The station master veneered his home and outbuildings with river rock cobbles, it is said to pass the time.

Notable people
 Raul Midón, musician
 Casimiro Barela, Colorado politician
 Susan K. Herrera, member of the New Mexico House of Representatives
 Ra Paulette, cave sculptor

Gallery

See also

 National Register of Historic Places listings in Rio Arriba County, New Mexico

References

External links

 "Offbeat New Mexico: Places of Unexpected History, Art, and Culture"
 "National Register of Historic Places: New Mexico - Rio Arriba County - Historic Districts"
 noaa.gov: Rio Grande at Embudo

Unincorporated communities in Rio Arriba County, New Mexico
History of Rio Arriba County, New Mexico
Northern Rio Grande National Heritage Area
Historic districts on the National Register of Historic Places in New Mexico
National Register of Historic Places in Rio Arriba County, New Mexico
Unincorporated communities in New Mexico
New Mexico populated places on the Rio Grande